The men's 400 metres at the 2010 IAAF World Indoor Championships will be held at the ASPIRE Dome on 12 and 13 March.

Medalists

Records

Qualification standards

Schedule

Results

Heats
Qualification: First 2 in each heat (Q) and the next 2 fastest (q) advance to the semifinals.

Semifinals
Qualification: First 3 in each heat (Q) qualified. to the final.

Final

References
Heats Results
Semifinals Results
Final Result

400 metres
400 metres at the World Athletics Indoor Championships